Glenea nigeriae is a species of beetle in the family Cerambycidae. It was described by Per Olof Christopher Aurivillius in 1920. It is known from Nigeria, Cameroon, and Equatorial Guinea.

References

nigeriae
Beetles described in 1920